Fulger is a surname. Notable people with the surname include:

 Holly Fulger (born 1956), American actress
 Mircea Fulger (born 1959), Romanian light-welterweight boxer

See also
 Folger